Semantic P2P networks are a new type of P2P network. It combines the advantages of unstructured P2P networks and structural P2P networks, and avoids their disadvantages.

In Semantic P2P networks, nodes are classified as DNS-like domain names with semantic meanings such as Alice @Brittney.popular.music. Semantic P2P networks contains prerequisite virtual tree topology and net-like topology formed by cached nodes.  Semantic P2P networks keep the semantic meanings of nodes and their contents. The nodes within semantic P2P networks can communicate each other by various languages. Semantic P2P network can execute complicated queries by SQL-like language.

There are similarities between semantic P2P systems and software agents. P2P means that entities exchange information directly without a mediator. Semantic is a concept to add meaning to information. Peer are usually autonomous systems as well as agents. Agents follow a goal, though. Such goal attainment requires a knowledge base and rules and strategies. That's the major difference between software agents and semantic peers. The latter lacks that kind of intelligence.

See also 
 Semantic desktop
 Semantic network
 Semantic Web

References
 http://www.computing.surrey.ac.uk/personal/pg/S.Stafrace/ServP2P09/keynote.html
 https://web.archive.org/web/20110626161639/http://www.gip.hk/bife2009/Keynote-licanhuang.pdf
 Lican Huang A P2P service discovery strategy based on content catalogues, Data Science Journal Vol(6), 2007, pp S492-S499
 Lican Huang, “VIRGO: Virtual Hierarchical Overlay Network for Scalable Grid Computing”, Proc. European Grid Conference (EGC2005), in LNCS 3470, pp911–921, February 14–16, 2005, Amsterdam, Netherlands.
 Lican Huang, “LARGE SCALE COOPERATIVE MULTIAGENT SYSTEM BASED ON SEMANTIC P2P NETWORK”, Proc. 2010 First International Conference on Networking and Distributed Computing (ICNDC2010), in LNCS 3470, pp381–386, Oct. 20–24, 2010, Hangzhou, China.
 * Shark is an open source non-commercial academic project that supports building semantic P2P systems
 DSCloud Platform is  a network operating system based on semantic P2P  networks  that is free for academic use.  https://www.yvsou.com   

Peer-to-peer computing